Jamalabad (also Romanized as Jamālābād) is a village in Meshgin-e Gharbi Rural District, in the Central District of Meshgin Shahr County, Ardabil Province, Iran. At the 2006 census, its population was 776, in 170 families.

References 

Towns and villages in Meshgin Shahr County